Edmond Novicki (born 20 September 1912) was a Polish-born French footballer who played with RC Lens, US Valenciennes, SC Fives and Olympique Lillois, as well as the France national team. He was of Polish descent having been born in Krapkowice.

References

External links
 
 
 
 Player profile at FFF 

1912 births
Polish emigrants to France
French footballers
France international footballers
RC Lens players
FC Sète 34 players
Valenciennes FC players
Ligue 1 players
Year of death unknown
Date of death unknown
Sportspeople from Opole Voivodeship
People from Krapkowice
Association football forwards
AC Avignonnais players
SC Douai players
SC Fives players
Olympique Lillois players